Icona is the third studio album by Italian singer and rapper Baby K, released on 16 November 2018 by Sony Music.
The album includes the singles "Voglio ballare con te" and "Da zero a cento".

Description  
Composed of ten tracks, the album represents a departure from the pop rap sounds of the first two albums in favor of others tending to electropop and reggaeton. The album was preceded by four singles, made available for digital download between 2017 and 2018.

Track listing

Charts

References

2018 albums